The Khodeswar Rain Shelter is a wildlife sanctuary and nature reserve in Jawiya, Jaswantpura, Rajasthan, India.

Geography
There is a wildlife sanctuary nearby covering an area of 107 square kilometers.

Philanthropy
Self Help Group is one of most famous charitable trust in Jawiya, Rajasthan. Self Help Group is Developer of Khodeswar Rain Shelter and Samundra Singh is  Dirctore of this group. They works to save wildlife.

References

Tourist attractions in Jalore district
Wildlife sanctuaries in Rajasthan
Protected areas with year of establishment missing